Richard Bernard (1568–1641) was an English Puritan clergyman and writer.

Life

Bernard was born in Epworth and received his education at Christ's College, Cambridge, where he matriculated in 1592, obtained his BA in 1595, and an MA in 1598. He was married in 1601 and had six children. From 1612 to 1641 he lived in Somerset and preached in Batcombe.

Bernard was a Calvinist Puritan, but a moderate one. Bernard advocated a joyful approach to life, instead of the more serious and pious disposition that was encouraged at the time. Bernard wrote:

He flirted with nonconformity with the Anglican Church when he was first preaching. He lost his job over his dissent in Worksop on 15 March 1605. He formed his own congregation of about 100 in 1606 in a separatist church, but then returned to his parish post in Worksop in 1607. He still refused to make the sign of the cross during baptisms, however. This led to him being brought before church courts again in 1608 and 1611.

When he was at Worksop he associated with well-known Puritans William Brewster (1567–1644), a passenger on the Mayflower, and John Robinson (1575–1625), who organised the Mayflower voyage.

Bernard wrote an influential handbook for ministers entitled , which was published in 1607 and 1621. His most popular book was The Isle of Man (1627) which went through 16 printings by 1683. He led his generation in his advocacy for the imprisoned, the poor, and the Jews, the latter argument was made in an essay titled "." within the book, .

He frequently wrote against Separation, which put him in conflict with Robinson and the New England churches.

His daughter Mary married Roger Williams, co-founder of the state of Rhode Island, in 1629. Roger and Mary Williams emigrated to the New World in 1631.

His predecessor at Batcombe was Philip Bisse; he was succeeded as preacher there by the Puritan theologian Richard Alleine.

Published work
  1602, 1607, 1612
 , 1607 
 , 1608 (Also ? – no copies exist)
 , 1609
 , 1609
 , 1610
 , 1610
 , 1612, 1629
 , 1613
 , 1616, 1628, 1650?
 , 1616
 , 1616
 , 1617
 , 1619
 , 1621
 , 1621
 , 1623, 1624
 , 1626
 1627, 1628, 1629, 1630, 1640, 1632, 1634, 1635, 1648, 1658, 1659, 1668, 1674, 1677, 1683; 1719, 1778, 1997 
 A Guide to Grand-Jury Men, 1627, 1629, 1630
 Ruth's Recompense, 1628
 , 1629
 , 1630, 1631, 1632, 1635, 1640
 Christian See To Thy Conscience Or A Treatise Of The Nature, The Kinds And Manifold Differences Of Conscience, 1631
 The Ready Way to Good Works, 1635
 , 1641
 , 1641
 , Richard Bernard;  John Bernard, [London : s.n.], 1641, 1661
 , 1641
 , 1642
 An Epistle Directed To All Justices Of Peace In England And Wales, 1642
 , 1644
 , 1661, 1664
Collected works in Latin and English, 1598 (?), 1607, 1614, 1629 and 1641. 
Bernard's first publication was a translation of the Latin poet Terence, which had at least six editions.

See also
A Guide to Grand-Jury Men
King James I
Witch-hunt

Notes

References
 Richard Bernard Puritan, Gary Brady.

Further reading
K. R. Narveson, "Richard Bernard," The Dictionary of Literary Biography, Volume 281: British Rhetoricians and Logicians, 1500–1660, Second Series, Detroit: Gale, 2003, pp. 14–25.

English religious writers
1568 births
1641 deaths
People from Epworth, Lincolnshire
17th-century English Puritan ministers
17th-century English writers
17th-century English male writers